Josh Appelbaum  is an American television writer, screenwriter, showrunner and producer.

Biography
Appelbaum is from a Jewish family. He attended the Riverdale Country School with longtime writing and producing partner André Nemec. He then went on to attend New York University's Tisch School for the Arts.

Appelbaum has written for shows such as Life on Mars, October Road, and the series Happy Town. He has also been a co-producer and screenwriter for such films as Mission: Impossible – Ghost Protocol.

He frequently collaborates with a tightly-knit group of film professionals which include J. J. Abrams, Damon Lindelof, Adam Horowitz, Alex Kurtzman, Roberto Orci, Edward Kitsis, Andre Nemec, Jeff Pinkner, and Bryan Burk.

In 2005, Appelbaum and Andre Nemec via Space Floor Television signed a deal with Touchstone Television.

Filmography

Films

Television

References

External links

American television writers
American male television writers
Living people
Skydance Media people
American film producers
Jewish American screenwriters
Year of birth missing (living people)
Riverdale Country School alumni
Tisch School of the Arts alumni